The Main Street Electrical Parade is a nighttime parade, created by Robert Jani and project director Ron Miziker. It features floats and live performers covered in over 600,000 electronically controlled LED lights, and uses a synchronized soundtrack triggered by radio control along key areas of the parade route.

The original parade at Disneyland in California ran from 1972 to 1996, and again in limited engagements in 2017, 2019, and 2022. The neighboring Disney California Adventure park hosted the parade between 2001 and 2010. Another version, at the Magic Kingdom in Florida's Walt Disney World Resort, ran between 1977 and 2016, with two major gaps during 1991–1999 and 2001–2010.

The parade has also spun off several other versions that ran or continue to run at Disney parks around the world. An updated version has run at Tokyo Disneyland as Tokyo Disneyland Electrical Parade: DreamLights since 2001. In 2014, Hong Kong Disneyland premiered a spiritual successor to the Main Street Electrical Parade, the Paint the Night Parade. An extended version of Paint the Night premiered at Disneyland on May 22, 2015, as part of the park's 60th anniversary celebration, and moved to Disney California Adventure on April 12, 2018.

The original Disneyland version of the parade ran at Walt Disney World's Magic Kingdom as "Disney's Main Street Electrical Parade" from June 5, 2010, to October 9, 2016, when it closed in preparation for a limited-time run at Disneyland. The Disneyland run started on January 19, 2017, and was planned to run through June 18, 2017, but due to popular demand, Disney extended the parade's run to August 20, 2017.

On June 28, 2019, Disneyland officially announced that the parade would once again return to Disneyland Park for another limited engagement run, which began on August 2, 2019, and ran through September 30, 2019.

On October 26, 2021, the Disney Parks' TikTok account released a video teasing the parade's return to Disneyland again. On November 20, 2021, it was announced at Destination D23 that the parade will return in spring 2022. Disney confirmed on February 22, 2022, that the parade would return on April 22, 2022, as well as revealing a reimagined To Honor America finale float that is more inclusive. The parade's 50th anniversary run began on April 20, 2022, during a soft opening that was live streamed on the Disney Parks Blog and had its "final performance of the season" on September 1, 2022.

History

Inspiration
The predecessor to the 1972 Disneyland Main Street Electrical Parade was the Electrical Water Pageant, a show consisting of fourteen 25-foot-tall (7.6 m) screens decorated with electrical lights and presented on Walt Disney World's Seven Seas Lagoon from 1971 to the present. Not long after the Electrical Water Pageant debuted, Card Walker commissioned the development of what became the Main Street Electrical Parade to provide Disneyland with a similar nighttime visual spectacle. The parade's design used nickel–cadmium batteries, which the Disney movie studio had recently started using, and Italian-made miniature bulbs that Disneyland staff had seen in light displays along Michigan Avenue in Chicago, Illinois. Disney arranged for the parade's original floats to be constructed by Silvestri, the Chicago-based company responsible for those holiday displays.

Two months to deadline, Disney discovered the float contractor was far behind schedule and decided to finish the floats themselves in a backstage area at Disneyland. Disney brought on welders, electricians and other temporary workers to assemble the floats and hand-tint and install 500,000 bulbs. The engineers who helped create the parade also created the first automated parade show-control program. Using radio-activated triggers as each float entered a zone, the audience would hear float-specific music through the park's audio system.

Early years
The first rehearsal was a disaster; a float crashed into a building on Main Street, U.S.A., and some performers' costumes emitted sparks. Despite these obstacles, the parade successfully debuted on schedule on June 17, 1972. The original parade floats featured the Blue Fairy, a large drum pulled by the Casey Jr. Engine, Cinderella, a Chinese dragon, and a circus calliope. Until 1977, some of the floats, such as the elephant train and the American flag finale, were flat screens on manually-pushed rolling platforms similar to the Electrical Water Pageant.

The Main Street Electrical Parade had counterparts of the same name and layout at Magic Kingdom in the Walt Disney World Resort, which ran from June 11, 1977, to September 14, 1991. It was replaced by a similar parade called SpectroMagic, which ran from October 1, 1991, to May 20, 1999, reopened on April 2, 2001, and ended on June 4, 2010. On April 12, 1992, the version from Magic Kingdom went to Disneyland Park at Disneyland Paris and ran there until March 23, 2003. It was then replaced by Fantillusion, a nighttime parade from Tokyo Disneyland that had earlier replaced the Tokyo version of the Main Street Electrical Parade, which ran from March 9, 1985, to June 21, 1995.

On June 14, 1997, a presentation of the Electrical Parade called the "Hercules Electrical Parade", ran on Broadway, Manhattan, New York City for the opening of Disney's New Amsterdam Theater and the film Hercules. Disney arranged for the lights to be all turned off on about eight blocks of Broadway up to the theater. All businesses complied, with the exception of Disney rival Warner Brothers. It was led by a custom Hercules title unit made for this one time only use. It was shown on national television on a one-hour promotional program featuring the music and making of Hercules.

Later years
The Main Street Electrical Parade closed at Disneyland on November 25, 1996, after a 24-year run. Light bulbs certified as having been part of the show were sold to collectors. The show's replacement, the Light Magic parade, opened in 1997 to disappointing results. Disney quickly cancelled Light Magic but held off in bringing back the popular Main Street Electrical Parade. However, the parade was refurbished and appeared at Magic Kingdom on May 21, 1999, for a limited engagement, just in time for Walt Disney World Millennium Celebration. The parade ended its run at Magic Kingdom on April 1, 2001, and SpectroMagic was brought back the following day.

The Main Street Electrical Parade floats were then sent back to California for the parade's return to Disneyland. These plans changed after Anaheim management saw the poor attendance figures for the spring break season at Disney California Adventure and feared that the park would fail to attract large crowds during the crucial summer season unless they had a big draw. So Disney announced that the popular Main Street Electrical Parade would be coming to Disney California Adventure Park on July 2, 2001, in honor of the park's first summer. The name of the show was changed from the Main Street Electrical Parade to Disney's Electrical Parade, as Disney California Adventure has no Main Street. Most of the 1996 parade floats returned.

On the 2008 Walt Disney World Christmas Day Parade special, Disney announced that the first new float in 20 years would be added to the classic parade. It was announced in 2009 that two units would be returning as well.

Disney's Electrical Parade at Disney California Adventure ended its run on April 18, 2010, and was sent to Magic Kingdom as part of the Walt Disney World 2010 promotional package "Summer Nightastic!"  The parade was not modified from its Disney California Adventure run, with the drum still saying "Disney's Electrical Parade", but the name of the parade itself was changed back to The Main Street Electrical Parade. The parade returned to Magic Kingdom on June 5, 2010. While it was initially announced that the parade would stay just through the summer, Disney later announced that the parade was on an "open-ended" run.

The parade ended its run at Magic Kingdom on October 9, 2016, in preparation for a limited-time return to Disneyland Park in California, which was scheduled to run from January 20 to June 18, 2017, before being extended to August 20, 2017. A special ticketed premiere event, costing , occurred on January 19, 2017. Disneyland restored the drum float to once again read "Main Street Electrical Parade" as well as "Disneyland Presents". Tinker Bell's float, added in 2009, was moved back to the Peter Pan unit and was altered for the 2017 run, making Casey Junior the new leader of the parade. On February 24, 2017, the pixie dust swooshes added to the floats in 2009 were removed, except on Tinker Bell's float, since Tinker Bell was no longer the parade's leader. On June 28, 2019, Disney announced that the Main Street Electrical Parade would return to Disneyland for a third run on August 2, 2019, and would run through September 30, 2019.
On July 22, 2019, to advertise the parade's new run, the official Disneyland Resort YouTube channel posted a slightly edited version of a commercial from two years prior. The parade ran at Disneyland from August 2 through September 30 for its 2019 seasonal run. On September 28, 2020, one of the spinning snails of the Alice In Wonderland unit made a special live appearance for Tyra Banks''' opening entrance for the 2020 Disney Night of Dancing With The Stars.

50th anniversary and beyond
One year later, on October 26, 2021, the Disney Parks TikTok released a video teasing the parade's return to Disneyland again, which was confirmed at Destination D23 on November 20, 2021. A return date for the parade was announced on February 22, 2022, to be April 22, 2022, and it would be another limited return engagement in honor of the parade's 50th anniversary. Disney also revealed that the "To Honor America" finale had been redesigned to be more inclusive and now features dolls from "it's a small world" that represent movies such as Brave, Hercules, Mulan, Coco, The Princess and the Frog, Moana, Pocahontas, Frozen, Raya and the Last Dragon, The Jungle Book, Aladdin, and Encanto, as well as the return of the Blue Fairy. The parade soft opened on April 20, 2022, and finished its 50th anniversary limited time run on September 1, 2022. On July 14, 2022, when Disney announced the parade's end date, the Disneyland website updated the parade's info to include “leaving for the season after September 1”, suggesting the parade will likely return again in the future.

Units
Over the years and numerous iterations of the parade, the roster of floats has changed. The version of the parade that has appeared in Disneyland, the Magic Kingdom, and Disneyland Paris has maintained a continuous set of units. These include The Casey Jr. train from Dumbo carrying Mickey Mouse, Minnie Mouse and Goofy and subsequent floats based on Alice in Wonderland, Cinderella, Peter Pan, Snow White and the Seven Dwarfs, Pinocchio, Pete's Dragon and a patriotic American float titled "To Honor America". Previous units included the Blue Fairy from Pinocchio, a circus float connected to Dumbo, an "It's a Small World" unit and a promotional float for Return to Oz in 1985, but it was destroyed by a fire. In 2022, Disney revealed that the "To Honor America" finale had been redesigned to be more inclusive and now features dolls as seen from "it's a small world" that represent movies such as Brave, Hercules, Mulan, Coco, The Princess and the Frog, Moana, Pocahontas, Frozen, Raya and the Last Dragon, The Jungle Book, Aladdin and Encanto, as well as the return of the Blue Fairy. The new float also features color changing lights, and the end portion of the unit being removed from the rest of the unit to create a new singular float. Tokyo Disneyland Electrical Parade: DreamLights features a number of floats featured in the western incarnation, though they are upgraded or alternate models. As of the 2017 renewal, the floats are Blue Fairy, Knights of Light, Mickey's Dreamlights Train, Alice in Wonderland, Disney Fairies, Pete's Dragon, Peter Pan, Toy Story 3, Aladdin, Tangled,  Cinderella, Beauty and the Beast, Frozen and It's a Small World.

Versions

There were 4 versions of the parade.

 Original Disneyland version 
The original Disneyland parade was built in 1972. This version ran at Disneyland Park (in Anaheim) from June 17, 1972, until 1974. It was replaced by America on Parade for two years.

 Redesigned Disneyland version 
In 1977, the floats were redesigned and updated by designer Bob Jani, based on his original 1972 designs, and built by Troy Barrett. The updated version premiered at Disneyland June 18, 1977. It then continued with one more major break during 1983–1985 until November 25, 1996. It then ran through Times Square in New York as the "Hercules Electrical Parade" for one night only on June 14, 1997. 
 
After this, both Pinocchio floats and the Seven Dwarfs Diamond Mine float were sent to Paris. The parade then went on hiatus for two years before being moved to Magic Kingdom (in Orlando), where it lasted from May 21, 1999, until April 1, 2001. After that, it moved to the struggling Disney's California Adventure Park (in Anaheim), where it ran from July 2, 2001, until April 18, 2010. In 2009, the parade's soundtrack was updated to match Tokyo's, while the Dumbo's Circus unit was removed from the parade and the Blue Fairy was replaced with a new TinkerBell float. When it ended there, it moved back to the Magic Kingdom (in Orlando), where it lasted from June 5, 2010, until October 9, 2016 
 
It then left Magic Kingdom (in Orlando) to move back to its home park, Disneyland (in Anaheim), where it ran from January 19, 2017 until August 20 of the same year. Disney later announced on June 28, 2019, that it would return to Disneyland for a third run which began on August 2, 2019, and ended on September 30, 2019. One year later, one of the spinning snails from the Alice in Wonderland unit made a live TV appearance on Dancing with the Stars on September 28, 2020, confirming the parade is on another hiatus. A year later on October 26, 2021, the Disney Parks TikTok released a video teasing the parade's return yet again, with the same snail being loaded onto a truck bound for Disneyland. The parade returned again for its 50th anniversary on April 20, 2022, and ran until September 1, 2022. Also for its 2022 return, Disney revealed that the "To Honor America" finale float had been redesigned to be more inclusive and now featured dolls from "it's a small world" that represent movies such as Brave, Hercules, Mulan, Coco, The Princess and the Frog, Moana, Pocahontas, Frozen, Raya and the Last Dragon, The Jungle Book, Aladdin, and Encanto, as well as the return of the Blue Fairy. The new float also features color changing lights, and the end portion of the unit being removed from the rest of the unit to create a new singular float. The opening logo unit also saw an update to the parade's logo similar to the text used at DCA and the 2010–2016 run at Walt Disney World, as well as a 50th anniversary logo for the 2022 return. A new inclusive opening fanfare that honor's the parade's legacy and Walt Disney's dedication of Disneyland in 1955 was also introduced for the 2022 return.

 Walt Disney World and Disneyland Paris version 
The Walt Disney World version was built in 1977 and premiered in Magic Kingdom (in Orlando) on June 11, 1977. It was a clone of the one that was running in Anaheim, with slightly wider floats due to Magic Kingdom's wider parade route. 
 
It ran there until September 14, 1991, but had one last performance on September 30, 1991, during a private media event. It was then moved across the Atlantic to Disneyland Park (Paris). Several floats from Tokyo and Anaheim were also sent to Paris in 1997. It lasted from April 12, 1992, up until March 23, 2003, where it was sent to Hong Kong Disneyland, but never appeared there.

 Tokyo Disneyland version 
The Tokyo Disneyland version was built in 1985. It premiered on March 9, 1985, and closed on June 21, 1995. When it closed, it was refurbished into "Tokyo Disneyland Electrical Parade: DreamLights". DreamLights premiered at Tokyo Disneyland on June 1, 2001.

In 1997, the Swan Lake Unit was sent to Disneyland Paris.

This version of the parade went on an unscheduled hiatus from February 29, 2020, to October 31, 2021, due to the COVID-19 pandemic. The parade returned on November 1, 2021, with physical dancers removed and some characters omitted due to Japan's physical distancing guidelines, as well as a new inclusive opening fanfare.

Music
The Main Street Electrical Parade's underlying theme song is entitled "Baroque Hoedown." The original version was created in 1967 by early synthesizer pioneers Jean-Jacques Perrey and Gershon Kingsley and appeared first on the album Kaleidoscopic Vibrations: Electronic Pop Music from Way Out. Originally, the parade's soundtrack had the same themes as the current recording, but was a different arrangement by Jim Christensen and Paul Beaver. In 1977, it was updated and arranged by electronic music artist Don Dorsey and Jack Wagner at Jack Wagner Studio, which was used until January 5, 2009, in Disney's Electrical Parade.

When the parade returned to Disney California Adventure on June 12, 2009, it began using the updated, orchestrated DreamLights soundtrack from Tokyo, but with changes made as certain floats in the California parade are not included in the Tokyo parade. The soundtrack for the current version, the 2009 version of Disney's Electrical Parade, The Main Street Electrical Parade (the last run ending in 2016 at Magic Kingdom), and the 2017. 2019 and 2022 runs of the Main Street Electrical Parade at Disneyland, as well as Tokyo Disneyland Electrical Parade DreamLights version were arranged, programmed and performed by Gregory Smith. Smith also arranged the music for Disneyland's Remember... Dreams Come True show (which also contains a snippet of the original Don Dorsey arrangement, which then concludes in a grand orchestral finale arranged by Smith) as well as Magical: Disney's New Nighttime Spectacular of Magical Celebrations fireworks shows.

The soundtrack to the parade has been released numerous times:Main Street Electrical Parade (1973 soundtrack) (Disneyland Park, Disneyland Resort)Main Street Electrical Parade (1977 soundtrack) (Disneyland and Magic Kingdom)The Music of Disney: A Legacy in Song (1992) (Disneyland Park, Disneyland Resort)Fantasmic!: Good Clashes with Evil in a Nighttime Spectacular (1992) (Disneyland Park, Disneyland Resort)Classic Disney Volume II: 60 Years of Musical Magic (1995) (Disneyland Park, Disneyland Resort)The Main Street Electrical Parade (1999 CD) (Magic Kingdom, Walt Disney World)Les Parades En Musique (2000 CD) (Disneyland Park, Disneyland Resort Paris)Disney's Electrical Parade (2001 CD)Tokyo Disneyland Electrical Parade Dreamlights (2001 CD)Tokyo Disneyland Electrical Parade Dreamlights - Show Mix Edition (2001)Tokyo Disneyland Electrical Parade Dreamlights ~Christmas~Tokyo Disneyland Electrical Parade Dreamlights (2011 Renewal Version)A Musical History of Disneyland (Disneyland Park, Disneyland Resort)Walt Disney Records The Legacy Collection: Disneyland (2015)Tokyo Disneyland Electrical Parade Dreamlights ~2017 Renewal Version~ (2017)

Dorsey used 11 synthesizers to create the soundtrack: Moog Model III, Mini-Moog, Steiner-Parker Synthacon, Oberheim 8-voice, Sequential Circuits Prophet-5, Fender Rhodes Piano, New England Digital Synclavier II, Bode 7702 Vocoder, Roland MKS-80 Super Jupiter, Yamaha DX7 and Yamaha TX7.

Wagner provides the synthesized vocoder voice for the intro and outro to the parade. Bill Rogers provided the synthesized vocoder announcement when the Disneyland version of the parade made its first visit to Magic Kingdom in 1999.  When the parade went to Disney California Adventure Park in 2001, the original Jack Wagner announcements for the Disneyland version of the parade were used as the basis for the announcements at the new park.  Since the park does not have a Main Street U.S.A., the announcements had to be updated with minor changes.  These included the insertion of the words "Disney" and "Disney's" to reflect that the show's name had changed to Disney's Electrical Parade.  When the soundtrack was updated, the announcements were rerecorded, but were still based on the original Jack Wagner announcements from Disneyland.

While the original soundtrack is played solely on synthesizers, the Tokyo Disneyland version uses an orchestra with adult and youth choirs in addition to harmonies and synthesizers. This version also includes Character voices in both English and Japanese. This version was also orchestrated, programmed, conducted and performed by Gregory Smith. During the Christmas season at Tokyo Disneyland, the Electrical Parade gets a new soundtrack; it is mostly the same soundtrack with added Christmas songs, mixed in with the theme music. For Tokyo Disneyland's 30th anniversary, a show stop was added to the parade, it includes a 2-minute Christmas medley; fireworks from Cinderella Castle are synced during the show stop as well. The showstop is only performed once a year as part of a private event for Disney/JCB Card holders.

The 2009 version of Disney's Electrical Parade at Disney's California Adventure, its 2010 run at Magic Kingdom and its 2017, 2019 and 2022 runs at Disneyland utilize much of the soundtrack created for DreamLights, with new loops created for the Cinderella, Pinocchio, To Honor America, and "it's a small world" units. However, the new soundtrack retains a more electronic sound than that of Tokyo's in that many of the orchestral parts of the DreamLights soundtrack have been replaced by synthesizers in this version. Whereas the Magic Kingdom used a newly recorded vocoder introduction for its 2010 version of the parade, the original 1977 Jack Wagner introduction was pitch-corrected to match the updated soundtrack and integrated into Disneyland's 2017 and 2019 versions of the parade. A new inclusive introduction that was both non-vocoded and vocoded was integrated in 2022 for its 50th anniversary at Disneyland by Bill Rogers. The new vocoded part of the 2022 intro is expected to be the new introduction of the parade should it ever return following its 50th anniversary run.

Disney has still yet to officially release the updated soundtrack used from 2001 to 2022 which is still in use today at Disneyland and Tokyo Disneyland.

Remixes, samples and parodies

A remix of the Electrical Parade (called the Retro Future Remix) was released on Dance Dance Revolution Disney Mix, and contains audio resamplings from the Apollo 8 reading of Genesis.
In Japan, Walt Disney Records released a CD called DJ Digs Main Street Electrical Parade which featured the theme music remixed by Japanese DJs.
The Japan only House☆Disney album, also released by Walt Disney Records, contains a remix of the song by famous Japanese DJ Shinichi Osawa. The remix subsequently appeared on the 2014 Disney remix album, Dconstructed.The album Eurobeat Disney 3, also only released in Japan, was done by the group A-Beat Power and features a remix of the song in Eurobeat style.
In 1998, a Disney Tribute Album entitled We Love Mickey ~ Happy 70th Anniversary (Walt Disney Records), featuring covers of Disney songs by Japanese artists, included a remake by The Eccentric Opera. The track uses samples from Dorsey's arrangement and Snow White. Lyrics appear to be in German and are from an unknown source.
A "Celtic"-inspired version was heard in the Main Street Electrical Parade's replacement Light Magic. Light Magic ran for one summer, never to return again.
 In The Simpsons episode "Selma's Choice" Lisa could be seen dancing in a dazed state in front of the Duff Gardens Light Parade with a musical take off of Main Street Electrical Parade Theme & Background music.
A cover version by They Might Be Giants was released on the Disneymania 2 album. The same version was also featured on the soundtrack of the film Moog and in The Middle episode "Orlando".
A parody of the parade can be found during the ending credits of Super Mario RPG and Paper Mario. In Super Mario RPG, the music heard during the credits is very close to the main melody of parade.
A cover version of Baroque Hoedown by ska band Reel Big Fish was included on the Japanese album Dive into Disney.
The vocaloid producer DaniwellP created a remix of the Electrical Parade using Hatsune Miku.
The parade is parodied in the 2002 film Scooby Doo as a spooky themed parade called The Electrical Torture Parade.
Episode 6 of Interspecies Reviewers uses an ending sequence different from the normal one parodying the Electric Parade.
In the 101 Dalmatians: The Series episode "Cruella World" the Electrical Fashion Parade is a homage to the Main Street Electrical Parade.
In Kirby and the Forgotten Land, the level titled The Wondaria Dream Parade could be seen as an homage to the Main Street Electrical Parade, even featuring synthesized music reminiscent of the parade's soundtrack.
In 2016, beginning is sampled in Joe Hawley Attacks by Tally Hall member Joe Hawley in his comedy hip hop solo Joe Hawley Joe Hawley''. Only difference is that the vocals are removed and the entire song sings “Joe Hawley” in electronic vocals like the original song sung by Rob Cantor and Joe Hawley

See also 
 Magic Kingdom attraction and entertainment history

References

External links 

The Main Street Electrical Parade Project YouTube channel which attempts to show every unit in parade history presented as a single parade.
"Cameo of Jewels" float at the Electrical Parade in the Memorial Coliseum, Los Angeles, 1932 at Los Angeles Times Photographic Archive (Collection 1429). UCLA Library Special Collections, Charles E. Young Research Library, University of California, Los Angeles.

Walt Disney Parks and Resorts parades
Disneyland
Magic Kingdom
Tokyo Disneyland
Main Street, U.S.A.
Amusement park attractions that closed in 2016
Amusement park attractions that closed in 2017
Amusement park attractions introduced in 2019
Amusement park attractions that closed in 2019
Amusement park attractions introduced in 2022
Amusement park attractions that closed in 2022